The Litta are an ancient noble Milanese family who produced two cardinals, Alfonso Litta and Lorenzo Litta. 
The Litta became Marquesses in XVII century and Dukes in 1810.

See also

 Palazzo Litta, Milan
 Madonna Litta

References

Families of Milan